The 1966-67 Primera División de Fútbol Profesional season is the th tournament of El Salvador's Primera División since its establishment of the National League system in 1948. The tournament began on 1966 and finished in 1967.

Team Information

Personnel and sponsoring

League standings

Top scorers

List of foreign players in the league
This is a list of foreign players in 1966-67 Campeonato. The following players:
have played at least one apetura game for the respective club.
have not been capped for the El Salvador national football team on any level, independently from the birthplace

ADLER
  Tomas Gamboa

C.D. Águila
  Jorge Tupinamba dos Santos 
 
Alianza F.C.
  Miguel Hermosilla
  Ricardo Sepúlveda
  Luis Hernán Álvarez
  Luis Ernesto Tapia

Atletico Marte
  Juan Andres Rios
  Carlos Chavano
  Ademar Saccone

Atlante
 

 (player released mid season)
  (player Injured mid season)
 Injury replacement player

C.D. FAS
  Nelson San Lorenzo
  Carlos Marin
  Gerardo Salazar
  Leonel Conde

Juventud Olimpico
  Juan Quarterone
  Víctor Viteca Pereira
  Raúl Canario Avellaneda

Once Municipal
 

Sonsonate
  Odir Jacques

UES

External links

1966
1966–67 in Salvadoran football